Global Fashion Group (GFG) is a Singaporean publicly traded e-commerce holding group.

In May 2019, GFG reported net revenue of over €1,359.7 billion for financial year 2020.

GFG is led by co-CEOs Patrick Schmidt and Christoph Barchewitz.

Schmidt, formerly CEO of THE ICONIC, is based in Kuala Lumpur, Malaysia. Barchewitz, formerly from Kinnevik AB, which is GFG's lead investor, is based in London, UK.

History 
Global Fashion Group (GFG) was established in 2014 through a consolidation of fashion e-commerce regional companies backed by Kinnevik and Rocket Internet. Its regional companies Dafiti, THE ICONIC, ZALORA and Jabong (later sold) were founded in 2011 and 2012.

In 2011 and 2012, the GFG regional companies began operations with a business model of selling inventory to customers from its own warehouses.

From 2013, the GFG regional companies started creating their own private-label brands, such as Lost Ink and ZALORA (formerly Ezra).

In April 2015, Romain Voog was appointed chief executive officer of GFG. He retained the role for approximately 3 years.

In 2016, GFG rolled out its Marketplace platform across key markets to complement its traditional inventory-led model.

In April 2017, GFG appointed Cynthia Gordon, a board member of Kinnevik, as the new Chair of GFG Board of Directors.

In February 2018, Patrick Schmidt and Christoph Barchewitz were appointed co-chief executive officers, succeeding Romain Voog.

As of July 2019, it is now listed on the Frankfurt Stock Exchange (ticker symbol: GFG).

Geographical operations and presence 
GFG is registered in Luxembourg, and headquartered in Singapore and London, UK. Through its four regional companies, GFG currently operates across 24 markets with a total population of more than 1 billion, serving a fashion market estimated to be worth over €350 billion.

Since their launch in 2011 and 2012, the five GFG regional companies have developed online fashion platforms in their respective markets.

The Group operates more than 10 warehouses across the world, including THE ICONIC's new 19,000sqm "fulfilment centre" in Australia and ZALORA’S new Regional e-Fulfilment Hub in Malaysia.

As of 31 December 2018, GFG has more than 11 million active customers and over 10,000 employees.

International brands 
In April 2017, ZALORA established a partnership with Abercrombie & Fitch. This partnership will provide Abercrombie & Fitch access to more than 600 million of ZALORA's online customers.

Private labels 
From 2013, the GFG regional companies started creating their own private label brands, with in-house design teams and collaboration with local designers. GFG private label brands include Lost Ink, ZALORA (formerly EZRA), ZALIA, 24:01 and Something Borrowed.

Business figures 
In April 2018, GFG reported net revenue of over €1 billion in 2017 (excluding Jabong and Namshi), with sales up 19.9% from 2016.

Still on its path to profitability, GFG improved its adjusted EBITDA margin from (12.5)% in 2016 to (8.9%) in 2017. It credits this improvement with investments and efficiency gains in marketing and fulfilment. Namshi was the first GFG regional company to achieve full-year profitability in 2016 with an adjusted EBITDA of €2.5 million.

GFG ended 2017 with €257.3 million in cash on a pro-forma basis.

Fundraising and M&A

Fundraising 
In 2015, GFG raised €150 million from existing investors Kinnevik and Rocket Internet in an internal financing round.

GFG secured additional funding of €330 million from existing shareholders led by Kinnevik and Rocket Internet during H1 2016. The funding round resulted in a cash balance of €342.6 million at the end of H1 2016.

Acquisitions 
In 2015, GFG acquired sports and outdoor activities e-commerce company Kanui, and kids/ baby-focused online retailer Tricae. Both deals are undisclosed and the two Brazil-based businesses have been integrated into Dafiti.

Strategic partnerships 
In February 2017, GFG announced a strategic partnership with one of the Philippines’ oldest and largest conglomerates, the Ayala Group. Ayala invested to take a 49% ownership in ZALORA Philippines.

Divestments 
In March 2016, GFG's South American business Dafiti sold its operations in Mexico.

In April 2016, GFG's Southeast Asian business ZALORA sold its operations in Thailand and Vietnam to retailer Central Group for an undisclosed amount.

In August 2016, GFG sold its Indian business Jabong to Flipkart for US$70 million in cash.

On December 13, 2022, GFG successfully completed the sale of Lamoda's business in Russia, Kazakhstan and Belarus to Yakov Panchenko, owner of the Stockmann department store chain.

References 

Online clothing retailers of Singapore
Retail companies established in 2011
Internet properties established in 2011